Tafarn-y-Gelyn is a small village in the east of Denbighshire,  North East Wales. Situated near Llanferres, at the foot of Moel Famau, just off the A494 road halfway between  Ruthin and Mold.

Tafarn-y-Gelyn (225m) is the start of the old coach road Bwlch Pen Barras across the Clwydian Range, between Moel Famau and Moel Fenlli. This was the original road from the Vale of Clwyd to Mold before the advent of the A494.

External links 

www.geograph.co.uk : photos of Tafarn-y-Gelyn and surrounding area

Villages in Denbighshire